Nickerson Ice Shelf, is an ice shelf about 35 miles wide, lying north of Siemiatkowski Glacier and the western part of Ruppert Coast, Marie Byrd Land, Antarctica. First observed and roughly mapped by the Byrd Antarctic Expedition (ByrdAE) (1928-30). Named by Advisory Committee on Antarctic Names (US-ACAN) for Commander H.J. Nickerson, U.S. Navy (USN), administrative officer on the staff of the Commander, Task Force 43, during Operation Deep Freeze 1966.

See also

 Ice shelves of Antarctica

References

Ice shelves of Antarctica
Bodies of ice of Marie Byrd Land